Lake Eunice Township is a township in Becker County, Minnesota, United States. The population was 1,538 as of the 2010 census.

Lake Eunice Township was organized in 1870.

Geography

Lakes
 Arrow Lake
 Bass Lake
 Big Cormorant Lake (east quarter)
 Buck Lake (west half)
 Bullhead Lake
 Carlston Lake
 Dahlberg Lake (southeast quarter)
 Dart Lake
 Dorff Lake
 Fish Lake
 Fog Lake
 Holstad Lake
 Hunt Lake
 Leaf Lake (southeast three-quarters)
 Little Cormorant Lake (south edge)
 Little Cormorant Lake (southeast half)
 Little Pearl Lake
 Lake Ellison
 Lake Eunice
 Lake Maud
 Loon Lake
 Moe Lake
 Mud Lake
 Pearl Lake
 Rider Lake
 Samson Lake
 Spear Lake

Adjacent townships
 Audubon Township (north)
 Detroit Township (northeast)
 Lake View Township (east)
 Candor Township, Otter Tail County (southeast)
 Dunn Township, Otter Tail County (south)
 Scambler Township, Otter Tail County (southwest)
 Cormorant Township (west)
 Lake Park Township (northwest)

Cemeteries
The township contains these six cemeteries: Augustana Lutheran, Elmwood, Lake Eunice, Lake Eunice Evangelical Free, Saint Mary of the Lakes and Saint Peter's.

Demographics
As of the census of 2000, there were 1,198 people, 506 households, and 364 families residing in the township. The racial makeup of the township was 96.74% White, 1.09% Native American, 0.08% Asian, 0.08% Pacific Islander, and 2.00% from two or more races. Hispanic or Latino of any race were 1.09% of the population.

There were 506 households, out of which 28.9% had children under the age of 18 living with them, 63.8% were married couples living together, 4.3% had a female householder with no husband present, and 27.9% were non-families. 23.1% of all households were made up of individuals, and 7.1% had someone living alone who was 65 years of age or older.  The average household size was 2.37 and the average family size was 2.79.

In the township the population was spread out, with 23.0% under the age of 18, 5.5% from 18 to 24, 26.2% from 25 to 44, 31.1% from 45 to 64, and 14.2% who were 65 years of age or older.  The median age was 42 years. For every 100 females, there were 116.6 males.  For every 100 females age 18 and over, there were 110.5 males.

The median income for a household in the township was $34,688, and the median income for a family was $43,393. Males had a median income of $30,735 versus $19,850 for females. The per capita income for the township was $18,756.  About 8.5% of families and 11.2% of the population were below the poverty line, including 14.9% of those under age 18 and 6.7% of those age 65 or over.

References
 United States National Atlas
 United States Census Bureau 2007 TIGER/Line Shapefiles
 United States Board on Geographic Names (GNIS)

External links
Lake Eunice Township official website

Townships in Becker County, Minnesota
Townships in Minnesota
Populated places established in 1870
1870 establishments in Minnesota